Saratoga Creek is a north-northeast flowing creek in Santa Clara County, California.

History
Saratoga Creek was originally called Arroyo Quito and then Campbell Creek after immigrant William Campbell, who operated a sawmill in 1848 in "Campbell's Redwoods" about three miles west of Saratoga, California, and also a stage station in 1852. The town of Campbell was founded by his son, Benjamin Campbell, in 1885. Other names for the creek included Big Moody Creek and San Jon Creek. The Board of Geographic Names officially decided on Saratoga Creek in May, 1954.

Watershed
It continues for about 1.5 miles through the low-density residential foothill region of the City of Saratoga and then for another 8 miles along the alluvial plain of the Santa Clara Valley, through the cities of San Jose and Santa Clara characterized by high-density residential neighborhoods. Saratoga Creek now joins San Tomas Aquino Creek shortly before joining the Guadalupe Slough and south San Francisco Bay. However, historically San Tomas Aquino Creek and Calabazas Creek were tributaries to Saratoga Creek, which was in turn a tributary of the Guadalupe River upstream of Alviso. Saratoga Creek and Calabazas Creek were disconnected from the Guadalupe River, and San Tomas Aquino Creek was extended directly into Guadalupe Slough by 1876, making Saratoga Creek its tributary. Calabazas Creek was detached from Saratoga Creek and re-routed directly into Guadalupe Slough at this time as well. The historic watershed can be viewed in the Thompson and West 1876 maps. The Guadalupe Slough carries the flows of San Thomas Aquino, Calabazas, and Saratoga Creeks out into south San Francisco Bay, passing just to the east of the Sunnyvale Water Pollution Control Ponds.

Major tributaries include Booker, Bonjetti and Congress Springs Creeks. Tributaries of Bonjetti Creek include McElroy Creek, Todd Creek, and Sanborn Creek. Congress Springs Creek was also known as Congress Hall Creek and is named for Congress Springs and the famous Congress Hall resort in Saratoga Springs, New York. California's Congress Hall resort at Congress Springs attracted tourists to the area until it burned down in 1903.

Most of Saratoga Creek contains natural channel with some modifications (e.g., gabion walls) and a few sections of hardened channel.

Ecology
Historically steelhead trout (coastal rainbow trout) (Oncorhyncus mykiss irideus) migrated from San Francisco Bay to spawn in Saratoga Creek and its tributaries. An 1877 report in the Sportsman Gazetteer touted the Congress Springs ("Congress Hall") tributary to San Franciscans for trout fishing. J. O. Snyder reported steelhead trout in Campbell Creek (now Saratoga Creek) in 1905. An impassable barrier at the confluence of San Tomas Aquino and Saratoga Creeks prevents salmonid fish passage to both creeks. However, stream resident rainbow trout are still found in Saratoga Creek. Recent genetic analysis has shown that the surviving rainbow trout are of native origin and not hatchery stock.

Recently, three of the originally native fish species have been collected from the creek including California roach (Lavinia symmetricus), Sacramento sucker (Catostomus occidentalis occidentalis) and rainbow trout.

Physical proof of the historic presence of Golden beaver (Castor canadensis) in south San Francisco Bay tributaries is a Castor canadensis subauratus skull in the Smithsonian Institution National Museum of Natural History collected by zoologist James Graham Cooper in Santa Clara, California on Dec. 31, 1855. Cooper lived in Mountain View, California from October to December 1855 and collected most of his specimens on Saratoga Creek (then Quito Creek).

The upper portions of the Saratoga Creek watershed are vegetated with broadleaved upland forest, especially mixed evergreen forest, including Coast redwood (Sequoia sempervirens) and Coast Douglas fir (Pseudotsuga menziesii var. menziesii), and chaparral. Common riparian tree species along the upper reaches of Saratoga Creek include White alder (Alnus rhombifolia), Big Leaf maple (Acer macrophyllum), and California bay (Umbellularia californica). Native riparian plant species occurring along the lower portions of Saratoga Creek (from Monroe Street to Lawrence Expressway) include arroyo willow, box elder, Fremont cottonwood, western sycamore, red willow, yellow willow, blue elderberry, coffeeberry, coyote brush, and mule fat. Nonnative weedy
species are common.

See also
List of watercourses in the San Francisco Bay Area

References

External links
 San Tomas Aquino Watershed (and Saratoga Creek Sub-watershed)
 Oakland Museum Guadalupe Slough Watershed Map

Rivers of Santa Clara County, California
Rivers of Northern California
Tributaries of San Francisco Bay